This is a list of all the United States Supreme Court cases from volume 390 of the United States Reports:

 Hardin v. Kentucky Util. Co., 
 Schneider v. Smith, 
 Epton v. New York,  (per curiam)
 Knight v. Board of Regents,  (per curiam)
 Paulaitis v. Paulaitis,  (per curiam)
 Wetter v. City of Indianapolis,  (per curiam)
 Bogart v. State Bar,  (per curiam)
 Cross v. United States Bd. of Parole,  (per curiam)
 Crepeault v. Vermont,  (per curiam)
 Marchetti v. United States, 
 Grosso v. United States, 
 Haynes v. United States, 
 Provident Tradesmens Bank & Trust Co. v. Patterson, 
 Smith v. Illinois, 
 Kolod v. United States,  (per curiam)
 Teitel Film Corp. v. Cusack,  (per curiam)
 Smith v. Noble Drilling Corp.,  (per curiam)
 Garafolo v. United States,  (per curiam)
 Albrecht v. Herald Co., 
 United States v. Third Nat. Bank in Nashville,  (per curiam)
 Rainwater v. Florida, 
 Roberts v. Warden, Md. Penitentiary, 
 Lee v. Kansas City,  (per curiam)
 Wynn v. Byrne,  (per curiam)
 Argo v. Alabama,  (per curiam)
 Robison v. United States,  (per curiam)
 Justice v. United States,  (per curiam)
 Jones v. Russell,  (per curiam)
 DeCesare v. United States,  (per curiam)
 Costello v. United States,  (per curiam)
 Piccioli v. United States,  (per curiam)
 Forgett v. United States,  (per curiam)
 Ortega v. Michigan,  (per curiam)
 Stone v. United States,  (per curiam)
 Anderson v. Georgia,  (per curiam)
 SEC v. New England Elec. System, 
 United States v. Habig, 
 United States v. Neifert-White Co., 
 Harris v. United States,  (per curiam)
 Federal Maritime Comm'n v. Aktiebolaget Svenska Amerika Linien, 
 NLRB v. United Ins. Co. of America, 
 Volkswagenwerk Aktiengesellschaft v. Federal Maritime Comm'n, 
 Norfolk & Western R. Co. v. Missouri Tax Comm'n, 
 Lee v. Washington,  (per curiam)
 Walker v. Wainwright,  (per curiam)
 Lookretis v. United States,  (per curiam)
 Hettleman v. Chicago Law Institute,  (per curiam)
 Wiseman v. Barby,  (per curiam)
 Felton v. Pensacola,  (per curiam)
 FTC v. Fred Meyer, Inc., 
 Poafpybitty v. Skelly Oil Co., 
 Simmons v. United States, 
 Newman v. Piggie Park Enterprises, Inc.,  (per curiam)
 Biggers v. Tennessee,  (per curiam)
 Shakin v. Board of Medical Examiners of Cal.,  (per curiam)
 Sullivan v. Georgia,  (per curiam)
 McBride v. Smith,  (per curiam)
 McSurely v. Ratliff,  (per curiam)
 Reed v. Mississippi,  (per curiam)
 Protective Comm. for Independent Stockholders of TMT Trailer Ferry, Inc. v. Anderson, 
 Alitalia-Linee Aeree Italiane, S. p. A. v. Lisi,  (per curiam)
 Anderson v. Johnson,  (per curiam)
 Reed Enterprises v. Clark,  (per curiam)
 Ortega v. Michigan,  (per curiam)
 Feris v. Balcom,  (per curiam)
 Lahman v. W. E. Gould & Co.,  (per curiam)
 Banks v. Chicago Grain Trimmers Assn., Inc., 
 Peoria Tribe of Okla. v. United States, 
 Avery v. Midland County, 
 Johnson v. Massachusetts,  (per curiam)
 Hogue v. Southern R. Co.,  (per curiam)
 Greenwald v. Wisconsin,  (per curiam)
 Anderson v. Nelson,  (per curiam)
 Atlantic Ins. Co. v. State Bd. of Equalization of Cal.,  (per curiam)
 Varnum v. California,  (per curiam)
 Hopkins v. Cohen, 
 Edwards v. Pacific Fruit Express Co., 
 In re Ruffalo, 
 Avco Corp. v. Machinists, 
 United States v. Johnson, 
 United States v. Jackson, 
 Fontaine v. California,  (per curiam)
 Bertera's Hopewell Foodland, Inc. v. Masters,  (per curiam)
 Incorporated Village of Port Jefferson v. Board of Supervisors of County of Suffolk,  (per curiam)
 Jehovah's Witnesses in State of Wash. v. King County Hospital Unit No. 1,  (per curiam)
 United States v. Coleman, 
 Stern v. South Chester Tube Co., 
 Cameron v. Johnson, 
 Ginsberg v. New York, 
 Interstate Circuit, Inc. v. Dallas, 
 Haswell v. Powell,  (per curiam)
 Times Mirror Co. v. United States,  (per curiam)
 Scafati v. Greenfield,  (per curiam)
 Till v. New Mexico,  (per curiam)
 Nationwide Mut. Ins. Co. v. Vaage,  (per curiam)
 Anderson v. Tiemann,  (per curiam)
 City of New York v. United States,  (per curiam)
 Safeguard Mut. Ins. Co. v. Housing Authority of Camden,  (per curiam)
 Garment Workers v. Scherer & Sons, Inc.,  (per curiam)
 Horlock v. Oglesby,  (per curiam)
 Barber v. Page, 
 St. Amant v. Thompson, 
 Hanner v. DeMarcus,  (per curiam)
 Southern Pacific Co. v. United States,  (per curiam)
 Hosack v. Smiley,  (per curiam)
 Della Rocca v. United States,  (per curiam)
 Roadway Express, Inc. v. Director, Div. of Taxation,  (per curiam)
 Sims v. Cohen,  (per curiam)
 Permian Basin Area Rate Cases,

External links

1968 in United States case law